Sweet Genevieve is a 1947 comedy film directed by Arthur Dreifuss and starring Jean Porter and Jimmy Lydon. It was produced by Sam Katzman.

Plot

Cast

Production
The film was announced in February 1947.

Filming started in April 1947.

References

External links
Sweet Geneveive at IMDb

1947 films
1947 comedy films
American comedy films
Columbia Pictures films
American black-and-white films
Films directed by Arthur Dreifuss
1940s American films